John Baudefait (fl. 1319) was an English politician.

He was a Member (MP) of the Parliament of England for New Shoreham in 1319.

References

Year of birth missing
Year of death missing
English MPs 1319
14th-century English politicians